The bowling competition at the 2022 World Games took place July 8–11, 2022, in Birmingham in United States, at the Birmingham–Jefferson Convention Complex.
Originally scheduled to take place in July 2021, the Games have been rescheduled for July 2022 as a result of the 2020 Summer Olympics postponement due to the COVID-19 pandemic.

Qualification

Participating nations

Medal table

Events

Men

Women

References

External links
 The World Games 2022
 World Bowling 

 
2022 World Games